Littlewick Green is a village in the north of civil parish of White Waltham (where the 2011 Census was included) and the south of the civil parish of Hurley, near Maidenhead in Berkshire, England.

The village is set around a village green, and includes the Church of England parish church of St  John the Evangelist (built in 1893), The Cricketers public house, village hall and parish school (now a private dwelling). It also includes Redroofs, the house where Ivor Novello lived and where he composed many of his most famous works.

Recently the village, and surrounding areas, have been the film locations for six episodes of the popular TV series Midsomer Murders.</ref>

.

References

Further reading

External links

 https://www.littlewickgreenvillagehall.co.uk/

Villages in Berkshire
Royal Borough of Windsor and Maidenhead